The Yevgenya class, Soviet designation Project 1258 Korund, are a series of minesweepers built for the Soviet Navy and export customers between 1967 and 1980.

Design
The Yevgenya class were small minesweepers built for inshore work. The hulls were constructed of glass-reinforced plastic.

As built, the minesweepers were powered by two diesel engines turning two propeller shafts creating . They carried  of diesel fuel. 

The vessels had twin-mounted  machine guns. They were equipped with MT-34, AT-2, SEMT-3, Neva and GKT-3 sweeps. The minesweepers mounted MG-7 sonar. They had a complement of 10.

Ships
The following navies have operated Yevgenya-class minesweepers:
 Angolan Navy - 2
 Russian Navy - about 45 in service in 1995
 Azerbaijan Navy - 5 ships
 Bulgarian Navy - 4 ships in service
 Cuban Navy - 11 ships transferred
 Indian Navy - 6 ships transferred (all decommissioned since 2006)
 Iraqi Navy - 3 ships (transferred in 1975)
 Mozambique - 2 ships transferred
 Nicaraguan Navy - 4 ships (ex Cuban)
 Syrian Navy - 5 ships transferred
 Vietnam Navy 2 ships
 Yemen Navy - 2 ships transferred

See also
 List of ships of the Soviet Navy
 List of ships of Russia by project number

Notes

Sources

External links
 All Yevgenya-class minesweepers - Complete Ship List

Mine warfare vessel classes
Minesweepers of the Soviet Navy
 
Minesweepers of the Azerbaijani Navy
Minesweepers of the Cuban Navy
Minesweepers of the Russian Navy
 
Minesweepers of the Syrian Navy
Minesweepers of the Ukrainian Navy
 
Minesweepers of the Vietnam People's Navy